Omar Ochoa (born 12 September 1971) is a Guatemalan cyclist. He competed in the men's individual road race at the 1996 Summer Olympics.

References

External links
 

1971 births
Living people
Guatemalan male cyclists
Olympic cyclists of Guatemala
Cyclists at the 1996 Summer Olympics
Place of birth missing (living people)